The Social Democratic Institutional Bloc (or BIS) is a left-wing populist, democratic socialist, social democratic and left-wing nationalist political party in the Dominican Republic.

History
Established in 1989,  it first contested national elections in 1994 when it was part of a Dominican Revolutionary Party-led alliance that won the Congressional elections. It was again part of the winning PRD bloc in the 1998 elections, before switching its allegiance to the Dominican Liberation Party for the 2002 elections. In the 2006 elections it was part of the victorious Progressive Bloc.

In the 2010 parliamentary elections the party won a seat in the Chamber of Deputies. In the 2016 elections it lost its seat in the House, but won a seat in the Senate. The party retained its Senate seat in the 2020 elections and won two seats in the Chamber.

See also
:Category:Social Democratic Institutional Bloc politicians

References

1989 establishments in the Dominican Republic
Political parties established in 1989
Political parties in the Dominican Republic
Social democratic parties in North America
Left-wing nationalist parties
Social democratic parties
Democratic socialist parties
Socialism in the Dominican Republic